Films produced in Ukraine:

1888–1919

 1910  / Shemelko-Denshchyk, directed by Oleksandr Ostroukhov-Arbo (silent film)
 1912  / Zaporizhian Sich, directed by Danylo Sakhnenko (silent film)
 1912  / Andriy's Love, directed by Danylo Sakhnenko (silent film)
 1913  / Poltava, directed by Danylo Sakhnenko (silent film)

1920s

 1926 Ягідка кохання / Love's Berries, directed by Oleksandr Dovzhenko (silent film)
 1926 Вася – реформатор / Vasia the Reformer, directed by Oleksandr Dovzhenko (silent film)
 1926 Тарас Трясило / Taras Triasylo, directed by Petro Chardynin (silent film)
 1926 Тарас Шевченко / Taras Shevchenko, directed by Petro Chardynin (silent film)
 1927 Сумка дипкур'єра / The Diplomatic Pouch, directed by Oleksandr Dovzhenko (silent film)
 1928 Арсенал / Arsenal, directed by Oleksandr Dovzhenko (silent film)
 1928 Звенигора / Zvenyhora, directed by Oleksandr Dovzhenko (silent film)
 1928 Шкурник / Leather-man, directed by Mykola Shpykovsky (silent film)
 1929 Хліб / Bread, directed by Mykola Shpykovsky (silent film)
 1929 Людина з кіноапаратом / Man with a Movie Camera, directed by Dzyha Vertov (documentary film)

1930s

 1930 Симфонія Донбасу / Enthusiasm (Symphony of the Donbas), directed by Dzyha Vertov
 1930 Земля / Earth, directed by Oleksandr Dovzhenko (silent film)
 1931 Кармелюк / Karmeliuk, directed by Favst Lopatynskyi
 1932 Іван / Ivan, directed by Oleksandr Dovzhenko (silent film)
 1932 Коліївщина / Koliyivshchyna, directed by Ivan Kavaleridze
 1934 Велика гра / The Great Game, directed by Heorhiy Tasin
 1934 Строгий юнак / A Severe Young Man, directed by Abram Room
 1935 Аероград / Aerograd, directed by Oleksandr Dovzhenko (sci-fi)
 1936 Наталка Полтавка / Natalka Poltavka, directed by Ivan Kavaleridze
 1936 Назар Стодоля / Nazar Stodolia, directed by Heorhiy Tasin
 1937 Запорожець за Дунаєм / A Zaporozhian Cossack beyond the Danube, directed by Ivan Kavaleridze
 1938 Кармелюк / Karmeliuk, directed by Heorhiy Tasin
 1939 Буковина, зeмля Українськa / Bukovina: a Ukrainian Land, directed by Oleksandr Dovzhenko
 1939 Щорс / Shchors, directed by Oleksandr Dovzhenko (documentary film)

1940s

 1940 Визволення / Liberation, directed by Oleksandr Dovzhenko
 1941 Богдан Хмельницький / Bohdan Khmelnytsky, directed by Ihor Savchenko
 1941 Таємничий острів / Mysterious Island, directed by Eduard Pentslin
 1942 Як гартувалась сталь / How the Steel Was Tempered, directed by Mark Donskoy
 1943 Битва за нашу Радянську Україну / Battle for Soviet Ukraine, directed by Oleksandr Dovzhenko 
 1944 Веселка / The Rainbow, directed by Mark Donskoy
 1945 Країна pідна / Soviet Earth, directed by Oleksandr Dovzhenko 
 1945 Перемога на Правобережній Україні та вигнання німецьких загарбників за межі українських радянських земель / Victory in the Ukraine and the Expulsion of the Germans from the Boundaries of the Ukrainian Soviet Lands, directed by Oleksandr Dovzhenko 
 1947 Подвиг розвідника / Secret Agent, directed by Borys Barnet
 1948 Мічурін / Michurin, directed by Oleksandr Dovzhenko 
 1949 Прощай, Америко / Farewell, America, directed by Oleksandr Dovzhenko

1950s

 1951 Тарас Шевченко / Taras Shevchenko, directed by Ihor Savchenko
 1952 В степах України / In the Steppes of Ukraine, directed by Tymofiy Levchuk
 1952 Украдене щастя / Stolen Happiness, directed by Hnat Yura (by the drama of Ivan Franko)
 1953 Запорожець за Дунаєм / A Zaporozhian Cossack beyond the Danube, directed by Vasyl Lapoknysh
 1953 Мартин Боруля / Martyn Borulia, directed by Oleksiy Shvachko
 1953 Доля Марини / Maryna's Destiny, directed by Viktor Ivchenko
 1954 Назар Стодоля / Nazar Stodolia, directed by Viktor Ivchenko 
 1955 Іван Франко / Ivan Franko, directed by Tymofiy Levchuk
 1955 Сватання на Гончарівці / Matchmaking at Honcharivka, directed by Ihor Zamhano
 1956 Є такий хлопець / There is such a Fellow, directed by Viktor Ivchenko
 1957 Правда / The Truth, directed by Viktor Dobrovolskyi and Isaac Shmaruk 
 1958 Надзвичайна подія / Extraordinary Event, directed by Viktor Ivchenko 
 1959 Іванна / Ivanna, directed by Viktor Ivchenko 
 1959 Григорій Сковорода / Hryhoriy Shovoroda, directed by Ivan Kavaleridze
 1959 Поема про море / Poem of the Sea, directed by Oleksandr Dovzhenko 
 1959 Небо кличе / Sky is Calling, directed by Valeriy Fokin

1960s

 1960 Наталія Ужвій / Nataliya Uzhviy, directed by Serhiy Paradzhanov
 1961 Біля крутого Яру / By the Step Ravine, directed by Kira Muratova and Oleksandr Muratov
 1961 Лісова пісня / Forest Song, directed by Viktor Ivchenko 
 1961 За двома зайцями / Chasing Two Hares, directed by Viktor Ivanov (by the play of Mykhailo Starytsky)
 1962 Квітка на камені (Ніхто так не кохав) / Flower on the Stone, directed by Serhiy Paradzhanov
 1962 Небо кличе / Battle Beyond the Sun, directed by Mykhailo Kariukov, Oleksandr Kozyr and Francis Ford Coppola (additional sequences US version)
 1963 Королева бензоколонки / Queen of the Gas Station, directed by Mykola Litus and Oleksiy Mishurin
 1963 Наймичка / Naimychka (The Servant Woman), directed by Ivan Levchenko (musical)
 1964 Наш чесний хліб / Our Honest Bread, directed by Kira Muratova and Oleksandr Muratov
 1964 Тіні забутих предків / Shadows of Forgotten Ancestors, directed by Serhiy Paradzhanov
 1964 Сон / The Dream, directed by Volodymyr Denysenko
 1964 Туманність Андромеди / The Andromeda Nebula, directed by Yevheniy Sherstobitov
 1965 Гадюка / The Viper, directed by Viktor Ivchenko
 1965 Вірність / Fidelity, directed by Petro Todorovskyi
 1965 Криниця для спраглих / Well for Thirsty, directed by Yuriy Illienko
 1966 Бур'ян / Wild Grass, directed by Anatoliy Bukovskyi
 1966 Соловей із села Маршинці / Nightingale from the Village of Marshyntsi, directed by Rostyslav Synko (musical featuring Sofia Rotaru)
 1967 Нудьги заради / Out of Boredom, directed by Artur Voitetskyi
 1967 Короткі зустрічі / Brief Encounters, directed by Kira Muratova
 1967 Київські мелодії / Kyiv Melodies, directed by Ihor Samborskyi 
 1968 Анничка / Annychka, directed by Borys Ivchenko
 1968 Камінний хрест / Stone Cross, directed by Leonid Osyka (by the novels of Vasyl Stefanyk)
 1969 Ми з України / We are from Ukraine, directed by Vasyl Illiashenko

1970s

 1970 Білий птах з чорною ознакою / White Bird with Black Mark, directed by Yuriy Illienko
 1970 Комісари / Commisars, directed by Mykola Mashchenko
 1970 Довгі проводи / Long Farewells, directed by Kira Muratova
 1971 Захар Беркут / Zakhar Berkut, directed by Leonid Osyka (by the story of Ivan Franko)
 1971 Червона рута / Chervona Ruta, directed by Roman Oleksiv (musical featuring Sofia Rotaru and Vasyl Zinkevych)
 1972 Наперекір усьому / Contrary to Everything, directed by Yuriy Illienko
 1972 Пропала Грамота / The Lost Letter, directed by Borys Ivchenko
 1973 Як гартувалась сталь / How the Steel Was Tempered, directed by Mykola Mashchenko
 1973 Повість про жінку / Novella About a Woman, directed by Volodymyr Denysenko
 1973 Коли людина посміхнулась / When Person Smiled, directed by Borys Ivchenko
 1973 У бій ідуть лише «старі» / Only Old Men are Going to Battle, directed by Leonid Bykov
 1974 Марина / Maryna, directed by Borys Ivchenko
 1975 Канал / The Channel, directed by Volodymyr Bortko
 1975 Пісня завжди з нами / Song is Always with Us, directed by Viktor Storozhenko (musical featuring Sofia Rotaru)
 1976 Ати-бати, йшли солдати... / Aty-baty, Soldiers were Going..., directed by Leonid Bykov
 1976 Тривожний місяць вересень / The Troubled Month of Veresen, directed by Leonid Osyka
 1977 Весь світ в очах твоїх... / All the World is in Your Eyes, directed by Stanislav Klymenko
 1978 Пізнаючи білий світ / Getting to Know the Big, Wide World, directed by Kira Muratova
 1978 Д'Артаньян та три мушкетери / D'Artagnan and Three Musketeers, directed by Heorhiy Yungvald-Khilkevych
 1978 Море / The Sea, directed by Leonid Osyka
 1978 Дізнання пілота Піркса / Test pilota Pirxa, directed by Marek Piestrak
 1979 Пригоди Електроніка / The Adventures of the Elektronic, directed by Kostiantyn Bromberg
 1979 Місце зустрічі змінити не можна / The Meeting Place Cannot Be Changed, directed by Stanislav Hovorukhin
 1979 Дударики / Dudaryky, directed by Stanislav Klymenko
 1979 Вавілон XX / Babylon XX, directed by Ivan Mykolaichuk

1980s

 1980 «Мерседес» втікає від погоні / Mercedes-Benz Escapes the Chase, directed by Yuriy Liashenko
 1980 Лісова пісня. Мавка / The Forest Song. Nymph, directed by Yuriy Illienko
 1980 Чорна курка, або Підземні жителі / Black Chicken or the Underground Inhabitants, directed by Viktor Hres
 1980 Ярослав Мудрий / Yaroslav the Wise, directed by Hryhoriy Kokhan
 1981 Високий перевал / High Pass, directed by Volodymyr Denysenko
 1981 Така пізня, така тепла осінь / Such Late, Such Warm Autumn, directed by Ivan Mykolaichuk
 1982 Трест, що луснув / The Trust That Has Burst, directed by Oleksandr Pavlovskyi
 1982 Чарівники / Wizards, directed by Kostiantyn Bromberg
 1982 Повернення Баттерфляй / The Return of Batterfly, directed by Oleh Fialko
 1983 Серед сірих каменів / Among Grey Stones, directed by Kira Muratova
 1983 Легенда про княгиню Ольгу / The Legend of Princess Olha, directed by Yuriy Illienko
 1983 Миргород та його мешканці / Myrhorod and its Inhabitants, directed by Mykhailo Illienko
 1983 Військово-польовий роман / Wartime Romance, directed by Petro Todorovskyi
 1983 Колесо історії / Wheel of History, directed by Stanislav Klymenko
 1983 Вир / Whirlpool, directed by Stanislav Klymenko
 1984 Украдене щастя / Stolen Happiness, directed by Yuriy Tkachenko (by the drama of Ivan Franko)
 1985 Вклонись до землі / Earth-reaching Bowing, directed by Leonid Osyka
 1986 У пошуках капітана Гранта / In Search of Captain Grant, directed by Stanislav Hovorukhin
 1986 І в звуках пам'ять відгукнеться... / And Memory Will Recall in the Sounds..., directed by Tymofiy Levchuk
 1986 Запорожець за Дунаєм / A Zaporozhian Cossack beyond the Danube, directed by Yuriy Suiarko
 1987 Все перемагає любов / Love Conquers All, directed by Mykola Mashchenko
 1987 Данило — князь Галицький / Danylo — Kniaz of Halychyna, directed by Yaroslav Lupiy
 1988 Нові пригоди Янкі при дворі короля Артура / New Adventures of a Yankee in King Arthur's Court, directed by Viktor Hres
 1988 Чорна Долина / Black Valley, directed by Halyna Horpynchenko
 1989 Астенічний синдром / The Asthenic Syndrome, directed by Kira Muratova
 1989 Небилиці про Івана / Fables about Ivan, directed by Borys Ivchenko
 1989 Камінна душа / Stone Soul, directed by Stanislav Klymenko
 1989 В Далеку Путь / Taking Off, directed by Oles Yanchuk (short film)

1990s

 1990 Посилка для Маргарет Тетчер / Package for Margaret Thatcher, directed by Vadym Kastelli
 1990 Лебедине озеро. Зона / Swan Lake: The Zone, directed by Yuriy Illienko
 1991 Голод-33 / Famine-33, directed by Oles Yanchuk
 1991 Козаки йдуть / Cossacks Go, directed by Serhiy Omelchuk
 1991 Останній бункер / The Last Bunker, directed by Vadym Illienko
 1991 Карпатське золото / Carpathian Gold, directed by Viktor Zhyvolub
 1991 Танго смерті / Tango of Death, directed by Oleksandr Muratov
 1991 Подарунок на іменини / Gift on Birthday, directed by Leonid Osyka
 1991 Іван та кобила / Ivan and Mare, directed by Volodymyr Fesenko
 1991 Чудо в краю забуття / Miracle in the Land of Oblivion, directed by Nataliya Motuzko
 1992 Голос трави / Sound of Grass, directed by Nataliya Motuzko
 1992 Кому вгору, кому вниз / To Whom is Up, To Whom is Down, directed by Stanislav Klymenko
 1992 Натурник / Sitter, directed by Viktor Vasylenko
 1992 Вінчання зі смертю / Wedding With Death, directed by Mykola Mashchenko
 1992 Кисневий голод / Oxygen Starvation, directed by Andriy Donchyk
 1992 Чотири листи фанери / Four Sheets of Plywood, directed by Ivan Havryliuk and Saido Kurbanov
 1992 Тарас Шевченко. Заповіт / Taras Shevchenko. Testament, directed by Stanislav Klymenko
 1992 Вишневі ночі / Cherry Nights, directed by Arkadiy Mikulskyi
 1993 Вперед, за скарбами гетьмана! / Hunt for Cossack Gold!, directed by Vadym Kastelli
 1993 Гетьманські клейноди / Hetman's Regalia, directed by Leonid Osyka
 1993 Фучжоу / Fuchzhou, directed by Mykhailo Illienko
 1993 Тіні війни / Shadows of War, directed by Heorhiy Gongadze (documentary film)
 1993 Сад Гетсиманський / Garden of Gethsemane, directed by Rostyslav Synko (by the novel of Ivan Bahriany)
 1994 Тигролови / Tiger Catchers, directed by Rostyslav Synko (by the novel of Ivan Bahriany)
 1994 Дорога на Січ / Road to Sich, directed by Serhiy Omelchuk
 1994 Захоплення / Passions, directed by Kira Muratova
 1994 Співачка Жозефіна, або мишачий народ / Josephine the Singer, or the Mouse Folk, directed by Serhiy Masloboishchykov
 1995 Атентат - осіннє вбивство в Мюнхені / Assassination. An Autumn Murder in Munich, directed by Oles Yanchuk
 1995 Москаль-чарівник / Moskal-Charivnyk, directed by Mykola Zasieiev-Rudenko
 1995 Страчені світанки / Executed Dawns, directed by Hryhoriy Kokhan
 1995 Партитура на могильному камені / Score on the Gravestone, directed by Yaroslav Lupiy 
 1996 Вальдшнепи / Woodcocks, directed by Oleksandr Muratov
 1996 Операція "Контракт" / Operation "Contract", directed by Tamara Boiko
 1997 Приятель небіжчика / A Friend of the Deceased, directed by Viacheslav Kryshtofovych
 1997 Сьомий маршрут / The Seventh Route, directed by Mykhailo Illienko
 1997 Три історії / Three Stories, directed by Kira Muratova
 1998 Тупик / Dead End, directed by Hryhoriy Kokhan
 1999 Усім привіт / Hello Everyone, directed by Dmytro Tomashpolskyi
 1999 Аве, Марія / Ave, Maria, directed by Liudmyla Yefymenko
 1999 Як коваль щастя шукав / How the Blacksmith Looked for Happiness, directed by Radomyr Vasylevsky
 1999 Прощай, Дніпро! / Farewell, Dnipro!, directed by Oleksandr Muratov (short film)
 1999 Схід — Захід / East/West, directed by Régis Wargnier

2000s

 2000 Нескорений / The Undefeated, directed by Oles Yanchuk
 2000 Мийники автомобілів / Car Washers, directed by Volodymyr Tykhyi
 2001 Провінціальний роман / Provincial Romance, directed by Oleksandr Muratov
 2001 На Полі Крові / Akeldama, directed by Yaroslav Lupiy
 2001 Молитва за гетьмана Мазепу / Prayer for Hetman Mazepa, directed by Yuriy Illienko
 2002 Чеховські мотиви / Chekhov's Motifs, directed by Kira Muratova
 2002 Чорна Рада / Chorna Rada (The Black Council), directed by Mykola Zasieiev-Rudenko
 2002 Таємниця Чингісхана / Secret of Genghis Khan, directed by Volodymyr Seveliev
 2002 Шум вітру / Wind Noise, directed by Serhiy Masloboishchykov
 2003 Мамай / Mamay, directed by Oles Sanin
 2003 Один у полі воїн / One Man Army, directed by Henadiy Virsta and Oleh Mosiychuk
 2003 Цикута / Cikuta, directed by Oleksandr Shapiro
 2003 Золота лихоманка / Gold Rush, directed by Mykhailo Bielikov
 2003 Вишивальниця в сутінках / Embroiderers in the dark, directed by Mykola Sedniev
 2004 Настроювач / The Tuner, directed by Kira Muratova
 2004 Трагічне кохання до зрадливої Нуськи / Tragic Love to Flighty Nuska, directed by Taras Tkachenko (short film)
 2004 Татарський триптих / Tatar Triptych, directed by Oleksandr Muratov
 2004 Проти Сонця / Against the Sun, directed by Valentyn Vasianovych
 2004 Михайлюки / Mykhailiuky, directed by Serhiy Krutyn (short film)
 2004 Водій для Віри / A Driver for Vira, directed by Pavlo Chukhrai
 2004 Залізна сотня / The Company of Heroes, directed by Oles Yanchuk
 2004 Украдене щастя / Stolen Happiness, directed by Andriy Donchyk (by the drama of Ivan Franko)
 2004 Між Гітлером і Сталіном — Україна в II Світовій війні / Between Hitler and Stalin, directed by Sviatoslav Novytsky (documentary film)
 2004 Червоний ренесанс / Red Renaissance, directed by Viktor Shkurin and Oleksandr Frolov (documentary film)
 2005 День Сьомий. Півтори Години У Стані Громадянської Війни / Day Seven, directed by Oles Sanin (documentary film)
 2005 Дрібний Дощ / Drizzle, directed by Heorhiy Deliyev (short film)
 2005 Далекий постріл / Far Shot, directed by Valeriy Shalyha
 2005 Братство / Brotherhood, directed by Stanislav Klymenko
 2005 Помаранчеве небо / The Orange Sky, directed by Oleksandr Kiriyenko
 2005 У рамках долі — Історія 1-ї української дивізії УНА 1943—1945 / History of the First Ukrainian Division UNA 1943-1945, directed by Taras Khymych (documentary film)
 2006 Убивство у зимовій Ялті / Murder in Winter Yalta, directed by Oleksandr Muratov
 2006 Прорвемось! / Stop Revolution!, directed by Ivan Kravchyshyn
 2006 Собор на крові / Sobor on the Blood, directed by Ihor Kobryn (documentary film)
 2006 Музей Степана Бандери У Лондоні / Stepan Bandera Museum In London, directed by Oles Yanchuk (documentary film)
 2006 Аврора / Aurora, directed by Oksana Bairak
 2006 Штольня / The Pit, directed by Liubomyr Levytskyi (Kobylchuk)
 2006 Хеппі Піпл / Happy People, directed by Oleksandr Shapiro
 2007 Два в одному / Two in One, directed by Kira Muratova
 2007 Біля річки / At the River, directed by Eva Neymann
 2007 Помаранчева любов / Orange Love, directed by Alan Badoiev
 2007 НАТО: свій чи чужий? / NATO: Friend or Foe?, directed by Vadym Kastelli (documentary film)
 2007 Приблуда / The Stray, directed by Valeriy Yamburskyi (short film)
 2007 Богдан-Зиновій Хмельницький / Bohdan-Zynoviy Khmelnytskyi, directed by Mykola Mashchenko
 2007 Запорожець за Дунаєм / A Zaporozhian Cossack beyond the Danube, directed by Mykola Zasieiev-Rudenko
 2008 Дума про Тараса Бульбу / Duma about Taras Bulba, directed by Petro Pinchuk and Yevhen Bereziak
 2008 Прикольна казка / Funny Tale, directed by Roman Shyrman
 2008 Сафо. Кохання без меж / Sappho. Love without Limits, directed by Robert Crombie
 2008 Владика Андрей / Metropolitan Andrey, directed by Oles Yanchuk
 2008 Ілюзія страху / Illusion of Fear, directed by Oleksandr Kiriyenko
 2008 Меніни / Las Meninas, directed by Ihor Podolchak
 2008 Райські птахи / Birds of Paradise, directed by Roman Balayan
 2008 Тринадцять місяців / Thirteen Months, directed by Illia Noiabrov
 2008 Обійми Мене / Embrace Me, directed by Liubomyr Levytskyi (Kobylchuk)
 2008 Закон / The Law, directed by Vitaliy Potrukh (short film)
 2009 Хай Бог розсудить їх... / Let God Judge Them, directed by Yevhen Khvorostianko (short film)
 2009 День переможених / Day of the Defeated, directed by Valeriy Yamburskyi
 2009 Вторнення / Invasion, directed by Artem Khakalo and Oleksandr Khakalo
 2009 Мелодія для шарманки / Melody for a Street-organ, directed by Kira Muratova

2010s

 2010 Щастя моє / My Joy, directed by Serhiy Loznytsia
 2010 Відторгнення / The Rejection, directed by Volodymyr Lert
 2010 Золотий вересень. Хроніка Галичини 1939-1941 / Golden September. The Halychyna Chronicles 1939-1941, directed by  Taras Khymych (documentary film)
 2010 Глухота / Deafness, directed by Myroslav Slaboshpytskyi (short film)
 2011 4 дні в травні / 4 Days in May, directed by Achim von Borries
 2011 Гамер / The Gamer, directed by Oleh Sientsov
 2011 Вона заплатила життям / She Paid the Ultimate Price, directed by Iryna Korpan (documentary film)
 2011 Той, хто пройшов крізь вогонь / Firecrosser, directed by Mykhailo Illienko
 2011 Легка, як пір'їнка / Feathered Dreams, directed by Andriy Rozhen
 2012 Вічне повернення. Кастинг / Eternal Redemption: The Casting, directed by Kira Muratova
 2012 Дім з башточкою / House with a Turret, directed by Eva Neymann
 2012 Ядерні відходи / Nuclear Waste, directed by Myroslav Slaboshpytskyi (short film)
 2012 Мамо, я льотчика люблю! / Mom, I Love a Pilot!, directed by Oleksandr Ihnatusha
 2012 Не переймайся / Don't Worry!, directed by Hanka Tretiak
 2012 Гайдамака / Haidamaka, directed by Roman Synchuk (short film)
 2012 Срібна Земля. Хроніка Карпатської України 1919-1939 / Silver Land. The Chronicles of Carpatho-Ukraine 1919-1939, directed by  Taras Khymych (documentary film)
 2012 Істальгія / Eastalgia, directed by Dariya Onyshchenko
 2012 Хайтарма / Haytarma, directed by Akhtem Seitablaiev
 2012 Звичайна справа / Business as Usual, directed by Valentyn Vasianovych
 2013 Delirium, directed by Ihor Podolchak
 2013 Присмерк / Twilight, directed by Valentyn Vasianovych (documentary film)
 2013 Креденс / Credenza, directed by Valentyn Vasianovych
 2013 Іван Сила / Strong Ivan, directed by Viktor Andiyenko
 2013 Параджанов / Paradjanov, directed by Serge Avedikian and Olena Fetisova
 2013 F 63.9 Хвороба кохання / F 63.9 Love Sickness, directed by Dmytro Tomashpilskyi and Olena Demianenko
 2013 Ломбард / Pawnshop, directed by Liubomyr Levytskyi (Kobylchuk)
 2013 Тіні Незабутих Предків / Unforgotten Shadows , directed by Liubomyr Levytskyi (Kobylchuk)
 2013 Брати. Остання сповідь / Brothers. The final confession, directed by Viktoriya Trofimenko
 2013 Зелена кофта / The Green Jacket, directed by Volodymyr Tykhyi
 2013 Такі красиві люди / Such Beautiful People, directed by Dmytro Moiseiev
 2013 Козацькі байки / Cossack's Fables, directed by Anton Zhadko (short film)
 2014 Трубач / Trumpeter, directed by Anatoliy Mateshko
 2014 Київський торт / Kyiv Cake, directed by Oleksiy Shaparev
 2014 Синевир / Synevyr, directed by Oleksandr Aloshechkin and Viacheslav Aloshechkin
 2014 Хроніка Української Повстанської Армії 1942-1954 / The Chronicles of Ukrainian Insurgent Army 1942-1954, directed by  Taras Khymych (documentary film)
 2014 Плем'я / The Tribe, directed by Myroslav Slaboshpytskyi
 2014 Поводир / The Guide, directed by Oles Sanin
 2014 Майдан / Maidan, directed by Serhiy Loznytsia (documentary film)
 2014 Пісня пісень / Song of Songs, directed by Eva Neymann
 2014 Одного разу в Україні / Once Upon a Time in Ukraine, directed by Ihor Parfonov
 2015 Козак та смерть / Cossack and Death, directed by Anton Zhadko (short film)
 2015 Легіон. Хроніка Української Галицької Армії 1918—1919 / Legion. The Chronicles of Ukrainian Halychyna Army 1918-1919, directed by  Taras Khymych (documentary film)
 2015 Зима у вогні: Боротьба України за свободу / Winter on Fire: Ukraine's Fight for Freedom, directed by Yevhen Afinieievskyi (documentary film)
 2015 Незламна / Indestructable, directed by Serhiy Mokrytskyi
 2015 Загублене місто / Lost City, directed by Vitaliy Potrukh
 2015 Гетьман / Hetman, directed by Valeriy Yamburskyi
 2015 Люби мене / Love Me, directed by Maryna Er Horbach and Mehmed Bahadir Er
 2015 Тепер я буду любити тебе / Now I'm Gonna Love You, directed by Roman Shyrman
 2015 Українські шерифи / Ukrainian Sheriffs, directed by Roman Bondarchuk (documentary film)
 2015 Жива Ватра / The Living Fire, directed by Ostap Kostiuk (documentary film)
 2015 Dixie Land directed by Roman Bondarchuk (documentary film)
 2016 Селфіпаті / #SelfieParty, directed by Liubomyr Levytskyi (Kobylchuk)
 2016 Моя бабуся Фані Каплан / My grandmother Fanny Kaplan, directed by Olena Demianenko
 2016 Гніздо горлиці / The Nest of the Turtledove, directed by Taras Tkachenko
 2016 Жива / Alive, directed by Taras Khymych 
 2016 Микита Кожум'яка (Драконячі чари) / Niki Tanner (The Dragon Spell), directed by Mamuk Depoian
 2016 Чунгул / Chunhul, directed by Oleksandr Aloshechkin and Viacheslav Aloshechkin
 2016 Осінні спогади / Autumn memories, directed by Ali Fakhr Mousavi
 2016 Слуга народу 2 / Servant of the People 2, directed by Oleksey Kiryushchenko
 2017 Люксембург / Luxembourg, directed by Myroslav Slaboshpytskyi
 2017 Інфоголік / Infoholic, directed by Valentyn Shpakov and Vladyslav Klymchuk
 2017 Сторожова застава / The Stronghold, directed by Yuriy Kovalov
 2017 Максим Оса / Maksym Osa, directed by Oleksiy Mamedov and Ivan Saitkin
 2017 Давай, танцюй! / Let's dance!, directed by Oleksand Berezan and Mykyta Bulhakov
 2017 Dustards / Dustards, directed by Stanislav Gurenko (documentary film)
 2017 Рівень чорного / Black Level, directed by Valentyn Vasyanovych
 2017 Межа / The Line, directed by Peter Bebjak
 2017 Кіборги. Герої не вмирають / Cyborgs: Heroes Never Die, directed by Akhtem Seitablaiev
 2017 Merry-Go-Round, directed by Ihor Podolchak
 2017 Червоний / Chervonyy, directed by Zaza Buadze

2020s
 2020 Віктор Робот / Victor Robot, directed by Anatoliy Lavrenishyn

See also
 List of Ukrainian submissions for the Academy Award for Best Foreign Language Film